Nine ships of the Royal Navy have borne the name HMS Diana after the figure from Roman mythology, whilst another was planned but later cancelled:

 , a 32-gun fifth rate launched in 1757, commanded by Alexander Schomberg c. 1758/1759, and sold in 1793.
 , a six gun schooner purchased in 1775 in North America, abandoned and burnt out later that year.
, a 38-gun fifth rate launched in 1794 and sold in 1815 to the Dutch Navy She was accidentally destroyed while in dry-dock on 16 January 1839.
 , a 10-gun brig purchased in 1807 in the East Indies and condemned at Rodrigues in 1810.
 , a 46-gun fifth rate launched in 1822, converted to harbour service in 1868 and broken up in 1874.
 , an Indian wooden paddle vessel launched in 1836 and sold in 1846.
 , an  second-class cruiser, launched in 1895 and sold in 1920.
 , a D-class destroyer launched in 1932, sold to the Royal Canadian Navy and renamed  in 1940, lost that year after a collision. 
 HMS Diana, a planned  destroyer, ordered in 1945 and cancelled in 1946.
 , a Daring-class destroyer, laid down as HMS Druid, but renamed in 1946 after the previously planned Diana was cancelled.  She was launched in 1952, sold in 1969 to the Peruvian Navy and renamed .  She was struck from their lists in 1993.

See also
 , an East India Company wooden paddle vessel launched in 1823 and purchased in 1824.  She was sold in 1826 to the Burmese government and broken up in 1836.

References
 

Royal Navy ship names